Leroy Harris (born July 3, 1954) is a former National Football League running back.

College career
Following a stint at Fort Scott Community College, Harris played two seasons for Arkansas State and was selected All-Southland Conference in both 1975 and 1976.  His 1976 season saw him rush for 1,046 yards on 150 carries with 12 touchdowns.

In two seasons with the Indians, Harris rushed for 1,920 yards on 274 carries (a 7.0 average) and 15 touchdowns. Despite his short time in Jonesboro, he was selected for the All-time ASU Team (1909–1975), chosen during the 1976 season.

Professional career

Following his collegiate days, Harris was drafted in the 5th round of the 1977 NFL Draft by the Miami Dolphins.

In his 5-year NFL career, Harris rushed for over 1,800 yards and scored 14 touchdowns with the Dolphins and the Philadelphia Eagles.

References

1954 births
Living people
Players of American football from Savannah, Georgia
American football running backs
Arkansas State Red Wolves football players
Miami Dolphins players
Philadelphia Eagles players